Harshaville is an unincorporated community in Hanover Township, Beaver County, Pennsylvania, United States.  It is located near the junction of Pennsylvania Route 18 and U.S. Route 30, near Raccoon Creek State Park.  The community is located at the terminus of Pennsylvania Route 151.

References

External links 
Map

Unincorporated communities in Beaver County, Pennsylvania
Pittsburgh metropolitan area
Unincorporated communities in Pennsylvania